Frederick Ferdinand Wolff, CBE, TD (13 October 1910 – 26 January 1988) was a British athlete, winner of gold medal in 4 × 400 m relay at the 1936 Summer Olympics.

Early life 
On 13 October 1910, Wolff was born in British Hong Kong, the eldest son of a family of four children. 
Wolff was a member of the Kowloon Cricket Club, where he won his first race in 1919.

Wolff and his family returned to England. Wolff attended Shirley House Preparatory School and Beaumont College in Windsor, England.

Career 

At the 1936 Berlin Olympic Games, Wolff ran the opening leg in the British 4 × 400 m relay team, which won the gold medal with a new European record of 3.09.0.

In 1929, Wolff joined the family firm Rudolf Wolff & Co. In the Second World War, Wolff served in the Oxfordshire and Buckinghamshire Light Infantry and was promoted to the rank of captain. Wolff rejoined Rudolf Wolff & Co. in 1946, and became a partner in 1951.

From 1970 to 1977 Wolff became the Committee Chairman of the London Metal Exchange helping establishing the LME's international reputation. He was made a CBE in 1975.

Wolff was the chairman of the Handicapped Children's Pilgrimage Trust.

Personal life 
Wolff married Natalie Winefred Virginia Byrne, the daughter of Ferdinand and Mary (née Keith) Byrne. Wolff had five children: Jennifer, John, Carolyn, Richard (twin) and Christine (twin).

On 26 January 1988, Wolff died in Marylebone, London, United Kingdom. He was 77. The British Olympic Association held a reception at the Buckingham Palace for all surviving British Olympic medalists on the day he died.

In 2015, Wolff's great-grandson Daniel Wolff competed in the 2015 Special Olympics World Summer Games in Los Angeles. His disability was autism.

References

External links
 
 
 Freddy Wolff obituary, American Metal Market 27 January 1988, Managing Director and Chairman of Rudolf Wolff & Co. and Chairman of the LME

British male sprinters
1910 births
1988 deaths
Commanders of the Order of the British Empire
Athletes (track and field) at the 1936 Summer Olympics
Olympic athletes of Great Britain
English Olympic medallists
Olympic gold medallists for Great Britain
English male sprinters
Hong Kong emigrants to England
Medalists at the 1936 Summer Olympics
Olympic gold medalists in athletics (track and field)
British expatriates in Hong Kong
British Army personnel of World War II
Oxfordshire and Buckinghamshire Light Infantry officers